Les Septvallons is a commune in the Aisne department of northern France. The municipality was established on 1 January 2016 and consists of the former communes of Glennes, Longueval-Barbonval, Merval, Perles, Révillon, Vauxcéré and Villers-en-Prayères.

See also 
Communes of the Aisne department

References 

Communes of Aisne

Communes nouvelles of Aisne
Populated places established in 2016
2016 establishments in France